Pratap Singh Bhonsale (18 January 1793 – 14 October 1847) was the eighth and last Chhatrapati of the Maratha Empire from 1808 to 1819. He was also the Raja of Satara until 1839, when he was replaced with Shahaji of Satara by the British.

Descent
He was born in the Bhonsle clan of Maratha caste.

Early life 
Pratap Singh was the eldest son of Shahu II of Satara, whom he succeeded, and a descendant of Shivaji, the founder of the Maratha Empire.

Emperor 
Pratap Singh was dethroned and stripped of his powers and personal possessions by the British in 1839. He was exiled to Benares and granted an allowance for his maintenance. Rango Bapuji Gupte, a loyal Sardar to him, long fought unsuccessful legal battles in London on his behalf.

He was succeeded by his brother, Appa Saheb, under the title Shreemant Maharaj Shaji Raja Chhatrapati of Satara. Appa Saheb then became known as Raja Shahaji.

Reign 

Pratap Singh built Pune-Satara Road, a palace called 'Rajwada' that was used as a court for 150 years. It is now in possession of the vanshaj of Udayan Maharaj). Pratap Singh High School was started around 1851. Dr Babasaheb Ambedkar was a pupil of this school until 4th standard.  

Pratap Singh's wife started a Private Library in Satara town in 1851 that was open to the public of Satara. The library now known as Nagar Vachanalaya, was once Chhatrapati Pratap Singh Maharaj (Thorle) Nagar Vachanalay Satara.  

He built the Satara-Medha-Mahabaleshwar Road in Mahabaleshwar (a hill station for Britishers he established Malcom Peth named for the contemporary Governor of Bombay (Now Mumbai) 48 km from Satara) State.  

Rajpath 2 ways from Rajwada to Powai Naka was built by him.  

He started two schools for English, Persian, Marathi, and Sanskrit in Satara. Modern Satara is his creation as Chhatrapati Shahu I's RangMahal was burned in a fire, following which he built Jal Mandir Palace as a residence for him and his family where now Chhatrapati Udayanraje Bhosale live.

References

Further reading 

1793 births
1847 deaths
Maharajas of Satara